Affairs of State is a 2018 American political thriller film directed by Eric Bross and starring David Corenswet, Thora Birch, David James Elliott, Grace Victoria Cox, Mimi Rogers, and Adrian Grenier. It was released in select theaters and via video on demand on June 15, 2018, by Lionsgate.

Synopsis
A young congressional aide, Michael Lawrence (David Corenswet), has an affair with the wife (Mimi Rogers) of his boss, Senator John Baines (David James Elliott). Meanwhile, Baines' ruthless top aide (Adrien Grenier) is in his way. Lawrence then unexpectedly falls for the Senator's daughter (Grace Victoria Cox) and must go tête à tête with his leftist activist housemate (Thora Birch).

Critical response
Noel Murray of the Los Angeles Times stated, "an engaging if ungainly hybrid of The Graduate and House of Cards, the political potboiler Affairs of State benefits greatly from being both timely and, for this day and age, uncommon. In an era when so many indies are either genre exercises or quirky dramedies, a well-acted, ripped-from-the-headlines melodrama is a novelty."

Conversely, Derek Smith of Slant Magazine offered in summation, "as Affairs of State'''s primary interests lie almost exclusively between the sheets, the intermittent jabs taken at establishment politics feel like disingenuous, cheap shots intended to give the film a sense of depth and gravity that it doesn't earn."

References

External links
 
 
 
 
 Affairs of State'' at the Numbers

2018 thriller films
2010s political thriller films
American political thriller films
Films directed by Eric Bross
Films set in Washington, D.C.
2010s English-language films
2010s American films